Bad Seeds is a 2018 French comedy-drama film written and directed by Kheiron who also plays the lead role, with Catherine Deneuve and André Dussollier in starring roles. It was released on 21 November 2018 in cinemas in France, and on 21 December 2018 on Netflix.

The film centers around Waël, a con man whose life is changed when he is forced to work as a mentor for a group of teenagers who face expulsion from school.

Plot
Waël (Kheiron) is a petty criminal who lives with his foster mother Monique (Catherine Deneuve) in a Paris suburb. They get food by conning older grocery shoppers out of their purchases outside a supermarket. One day, when they try to rob Victor (André Dussollier), he recognises Monique as an old friend he had not seen for 30 years. He doesn't press charges in exchange for Waël and Monique working for him on a volunteer basis, Waël as a mentor for troubled teenagers who have been expelled, and Monique as Victor's secretary at the youth club he runs.

Throughout the film, Waël's background is presented in flashbacks to his childhood in Lebanon in a Muslim village. The entire population of the village, including Waël's family, was massacred by Christian and Jewish soldiers when he was very small. He survived by pretending to be blind and picking pockets in a nearby city.  It’s in this city where he witnesses two thugs rob and murder a young couple.  Believing Waël is blind, they leave him alone.  He is found and brought into a Christian orphanage by a nun: a young Monique.  These thugs later see Waël in the marketplace with Monique and realize he is not blind.  They break into the orphanage looking to kill Waël who runs away.  He is again found by Monique and they escape to France where Monique raises Waël as her own child.

Waël connects with the recalcitrant teenagers, but they only agree to return to the youth club when he offers them €10 per day. There are six students in the group: the intelligent and arrogant Nadia, Shana who admires Nadia with little will of her own, Karim and Ludo who are from neighbouring areas at war with each other, the Romany boy Jimmy who can't read or write and doesn't speak much French, and Fabrice who seems generally disaffected with life. Over the following week, Waël gains their confidence, sometimes by exaggerating his own abilities, or pretending that he has invented important things or coined well-known sayings.

The group bonds and together teach Jimmy to read and Nadia to communicate with more humility. Shana confides in Waël her father has sexually abused her, and he convinces her to tell her mother. Meanwhile, Ludo is being harassed by Franck, an unscrupulous police officer who threatens to tell social services that Ludo's siblings should be placed in foster care unless he agrees to sell drugs for him.

Waël appears to believe that Franck is Ludo's youth worker and tells him the €10 bills he gives to the kids every day are counterfeit. He claims that he regularly buys small sums in counterfeit money to use for minor transactions. Franck asks Waël to provide him with a very large sum in counterfeit bills. Waël reluctantly tells Franck that he will do it and they meet on a rooftop. In a flashback, it is revealed that Karim told Waël about Ludo's trouble with Franck and Waël contacted the police. When Franck realizes has been betrayed, he beats up Waël.  The police arrive and arrest Franck before he can shoot Waël.

Waël survives and, in the final scene of the film, the students give him a book of quotations, showing they knew all along he had been pretending to be more than he was. By now they are all returning to the club of their own free will, without being paid for it.

Cast
 Kheiron as Waël
 Catherine Deneuve as Monique
 André Dussollier as Victor
 Louison Blivet as Shana
 Adil Dehbi as Fabrice
 Hakou Benosmane as Karim
 Youssouf Wague as Ludo
 Ouassima Zrouki as Nadia
 Joseph Jovanovic as Jimmy 
 Alban Lenoir as Franck
 Ingrid Donnadieu as young Monique
 Leila Boumedjane as Sarah
 Aymen Wardane as little boy Waël
 Elyazid Riha as Joseph
 Fianso as Usamah
 Medine as Djallil

Reception
Bad Seeds received mixed reviews in the press. Fabrice Leclerc who reviewed the movie for Paris Match praised Kheiron's acting skills, while Christophe Carrière in L'Express called him "n'est pas seulement drôle [...] aussi pertinent" ("not only funny but also relevant"). Other reviewers commented on the overly facile way in which conflicts were resolved or overlooked, which Nathalie Simon in Le Figaro called "naïve" while Scott Tobias in New York Times said that the message "...arrives one corny aphorism at a time". Eddie Strait in the Daily Dot, while admitting that the script contained many clichés, thought that the actors made up for it and argued that "...Bad Seeds hits the mark often enough to warrant watching."

References

External links

2010s French-language films
2018 films
2010s teen comedy-drama films
French teen comedy-drama films
2018 comedy-drama films
French-language Netflix original films
2010s French films